Joshua Cole Rogers (born July 10, 1994) is an American professional baseball pitcher in the Colorado Rockies organization. He has previously played in MLB for the Baltimore Orioles and Washington Nationals.

Career

Amateur
Rogers attended New Albany High School in New Albany, Indiana and played college baseball at the University of Louisville. In 2014 and 2015, he played collegiate summer baseball with the Bourne Braves of the Cape Cod Baseball League.

New York Yankees
He was drafted by the New York Yankees in the 11th round of the 2015 Major League Baseball Draft.

Rogers made his professional debut with the Staten Island Yankees and was promoted to the Charleston RiverDogs after three games. In 13.1 innings pitched between both teams, he posted a 4.05 ERA. He pitched 2016 with Charleston and the Tampa Yankees, posting a combined 12-6 record and 2.38 ERA in 24 games started between the two clubs, and 2017 with both Tampa and the Trenton Thunder, pitching to a combined 8-5 record and 3.24 ERA between both teams. He began 2018 with the Scranton/Wilkes-Barre RailRiders of the Class AAA International League.

Baltimore Orioles

On July 24, 2018, the Yankees traded Rogers, Dillon Tate, and Cody Carroll to the Baltimore Orioles for Zach Britton. The Orioles assigned him to the Norfolk Tides of the Class AAA International League. In 24 starts between Scranton/Wilkes-Barre and Norfolk, he was 8-9 with a 3.54 ERA.

Baltimore promoted Rogers to the major leagues on August 28, 2018, and he made his major league debut that same night. He made three starts for the Orioles, going 1-2 with an 8.49 ERA. On July 3, 2019, Rogers underwent Tommy John surgery. He was outrighted off the Orioles roster on October 30, 2019. Rogers did not play in a game in 2020 due to the cancellation of the minor league season because of the COVID-19 pandemic.

In 2021, Rogers went 0-3 with a 7.79 ERA in 4 appearances for the Triple-A Norfolk Tides before he was released by the Orioles organization on May 31, 2021.

Washington Nationals
On June 4, 2021, Rogers signed a minor league contract with the Washington Nationals organization. The Nationals selected Rogers' contract on September 4, 2021, calling him up as the 29th man in a doubleheader against the New York Mets. He made his debut the same day and pitched 5.2 innings allowing 3 runs on 4 hits with 5 strikeouts. He was designated for assignment on August 2, 2022. He elected free agency on August 5.

Miami Marlins
On August 10, 2022, Rogers signed a minor league deal with the Miami Marlins. He elected free agency on November 10, 2022.

Colorado Rockies
On January 10, 2023, Rogers signed a minor league deal with the Colorado Rockies.

References

External links

1994 births
Living people
People from New Albany, Indiana
Baseball players from Indiana
Major League Baseball pitchers
Baltimore Orioles players
Washington Nationals players
Louisville Cardinals baseball players
Bourne Braves players
Staten Island Yankees players
Charleston RiverDogs players
Tampa Yankees players
Trenton Thunder players
Scranton/Wilkes-Barre RailRiders players
Norfolk Tides players
Rochester Red Wings players
Harrisburg Senators players
Florida Complex League Nationals players